Arctodiaptomus is a genus of copepods in the family Diaptomidae.

Species

The following species are recognised in genus Arctodiaptomus:

Arctodiaptomus acutulus (Brian, 1927)
Arctodiaptomus alpinus (Imhof, 1885)
Arctodiaptomus altissimus Kiefer, 1936
Arctodiaptomus anudarini Borutsky, 1959
Arctodiaptomus arapahoensis (Dodds, 1915)
Arctodiaptomus asymmetricus (Marsh, 1907)
Arctodiaptomus bacillifer (Koelbel, 1885)
Arctodiaptomus belgrati Mann, 1940
Arctodiaptomus brevirostris Dussart, 1974
Arctodiaptomus burduricus Kiefer, 1939
Arctodiaptomus byzantius Mann, 1940
Arctodiaptomus centetes Brehm, 1938
Arctodiaptomus curdicus Brehm, 1938
Arctodiaptomus dahuricus Borutsky, 1959
Arctodiaptomus dentifer (Smirnov, 1928)
Arctodiaptomus dorsalis (Marsh, 1907)
Arctodiaptomus dudichi Kiefer, 1932
Arctodiaptomus euacanthus Kiefer, 1935
Arctodiaptomus fischeri (Rylov, 1918)
Arctodiaptomus floridanus (Marsh, 1926)
Arctodiaptomus hsichowensis Hsiao, 1950
Arctodiaptomus jurisowitchi Löffler, 1968
Arctodiaptomus kamtschaticus Borutsky, 1953
Arctodiaptomus kerkyrensis Pesta, 1935
Arctodiaptomus klebanovskyi Stepanova, 1999
Arctodiaptomus kliei (Kiefer, 1933)
Arctodiaptomus kurilensis Kiefer, 1937
Arctodiaptomus laticeps (G. O. Sars, 1862)
Arctodiaptomus lindbergi Brehm, 1959
Arctodiaptomus lisichowensis Shen, 1956
Arctodiaptomus lobulifer (Rylov, 1927)
Arctodiaptomus michaeli Reddy, Balkhi & Yousuf, 1990
Arctodiaptomus mildredi Streletskaya, 1986
Arctodiaptomus naurzumensis Stepanova, 1994
Arctodiaptomus nepalensis Uéno, 1966
Arctodiaptomus novosibiricus Kiefer, 1971
Arctodiaptomus omskensis Stepanova, 1999
Arctodiaptomus osmanus Kiefer, 1974
Arctodiaptomus parvispineus Kiefer, 1935
Arctodiaptomus paulseni (G. O. Sars, 1903)
Arctodiaptomus pectinicornis (Wierzejski, 1887)
Arctodiaptomus salinus (Daday, 1885)
Arctodiaptomus saltillinus (Brewer, 1898)
Arctodiaptomus similis (Baird, 1859)
Arctodiaptomus spectabilis Mann, 1940
Arctodiaptomus spinosus (Daday, 1891)
Arctodiaptomus spirulus Shen, 1956
Arctodiaptomus steindachneri (Richard, 1897)
Arctodiaptomus stewartianus (Brehm, 1925)
Arctodiaptomus tianchiensis Chen & Hu, 1989
Arctodiaptomus toni Brehm, 1937
Arctodiaptomus ulomskyi Chechuro, 1960
Arctodiaptomus walterianus (Brehm, 1925)
Arctodiaptomus wierzejskii (Richard, 1888)
Arctodiaptomus winbergi Stepanova, 2001

The species Limnocalanus johanseni was formerly included in this genus.

References

Diaptomidae
Taxonomy articles created by Polbot